Rafael Nadal defeated Andy Murray in the final, 6–1, 6–2 to win the men's singles tennis title at the 2009 Indian Wells Masters.

Novak Djokovic was the defending champion, but lost in the quarterfinals to Andy Roddick.

Seeds
All seeds receive a bye into the second round.

Draw

Finals

Top half

Section 1

Section 2

Section 3

Section 4

Bottom half

Section 5

Section 6

Section 7

Section 8

Qualifying

Seeds

Qualifiers

Lucky losers

Draw

First qualifier

Second qualifier

Third qualifier

Fourth qualifier

Fifth qualifier

Sixth qualifier

Seventh qualifier

Eighth qualifier

Ninth qualifier

Tenth qualifier

Eleventh qualifier

Twelfth qualifier

External links 
Draw
Qualifying Draw

2009 ATP World Tour
2009 BNP Paribas Open